The 1943–44 Toronto Maple Leafs season was Toronto's 27th season in the National Hockey League (NHL).

Offseason

Regular season

Final standings

Record vs. opponents

Schedule and results

Playoffs

Player statistics

Regular season
Scoring

Goaltending

Playoffs
Scoring

Goaltending

Awards and records

Transactions
September 11, 1943: Acquired Garth Boesch from the Brooklyn Americans in Dispersal Draw
November 1, 1943: Acquired Red Garrett, Gordon Bell and cash from the New York Rangers for Bucko McDonald
November 18, 1943: Called up Jean Marois from the Toronto St. Michael's Majors of the OHA
November 27, 1943: Loaned George Abbott to the Boston Bruins for one game
December 22, 1943: Loaned Paul Bibeault from the Montreal Canadiens for remainder of the 1943–44 season

References

Toronto Maple Leafs seasons
Toronto
Toronto